The Señorío de Sanlúcar or Lordship of Sanlúcar was an independent Christian lordship in the Kingdom of Castile located in and around the modern day city of Sanlúcar de Barrameda. It was taken from the Kingdom of Granada in 1295.

History

Establishment 

The Señorío de Sanlúcar was a Spanish Lordship located in the Kingdom of Seville which in turn belonged at the time of its formation to the Kingdom of Castile. The Señorío was created by order of King Sancho IV of Castile on 4 April 1295 and granted to Alfonso Pérez de Guzmán el Bueno for services rendered to the Castilian crown, specifically, his heroic defence of Tarifa during the Spanish Reconquista. Although Sancho IV died before handing over control officially to Guzmán el Bueno, his son, Ferdinand IV of Castile confirmed the handover to Guzmán as follows La Villa de Sanlúcar con todos sus pobladores, términos y pertenencias, y los pechos y derechos que allí tenía y deber había (En: The Lordship of the town of Sanlúcar with all its people, income and belongings and the rights which this land held and should hold). The handover was signed at Toro on 13 October 1297 and the original documents are archived at the Archive of the House of Medina Sidonia. Alfonso Pérez de Guzmán el Bueno and his descendants used the denomination Señor de Sanlúcar as the first and most prestigious of their noble titles.

Early Years 

In its inception, the Señorío de Sanlúcar included the town of Sanlúcar which is today the city of Sanlúcar de Barrameda and its surrounding lands which included the Port of Barrameda, Trebujena, Chipiona and Rota. These four supplementary towns which originally formed the Señorío de Sanlúcar were separated from the Señorío as part of the dowry of Isabel Pérez de Guzmán, one of the daughters of Alfonso Pérez de Guzmán el Bueno who went on to marry Fernán Ponce de Léon. Thereafter, these towns were incorporated into the collective holdings of the House of Ponce de León a branch of the House of Arcos.

Control to the House of Medina Sidonia 

Trebujena was made into an independent town chartae populationis on 21 April 1494 by order of Juan Alonso Pérez de Guzmán y de Ribera, the III Duke of Medina Sidonia.

The Señorío de Sanlúcar was the power base of the House of Medina Sidonia until 1645 when Sanlúcar de Barrameda was incorporated into the Spanish crown. This occurred in the aftermath of the Andalusian independentist conspiracy, an effort by the House of Medina Sidonia to consolidate power at the expense of the Spanish crown. As a result, much of their holdings were confiscated by the crown. Today, the Costa Noroeste de Cádiz roughly encapsulates the former extent of the original Señorío de Sanlúcar.

The Señors de Sanlúcar

References 
 Much of the information on this page was translated from its Spanish and Euskara equivalents.

Bibliography 
 Historia del Señorío de Albarracín (José Luis Castán Esteban) (In Spanish)

History of Andalusia